The 1967 season was the sixth season of national competitive association football in Australia and 84th overall.

National teams

Australia national soccer team

Results and fixtures

Friendlies
Australia hosted a three-match test series against Scotland. There was much criticism of the Scottish squad after a number of their best players had elected to stay behind because of their clubs commitments in Europe. The matches were recognised as A international matches for Australia, but not for Scotland.

1967 South Vietnam Independence Cup
The national team was invited to play in the 1967 South Vietnam Independence Cup hosted in South Vietnam. The began against their rivals' New Zealand with the result being a 5–3 win. They had then won against host South Vietnam 1–0 by a goal from Johnny Warren. Australia finished their group stage by winning 5–1 against Singapore. After they won the semi-final in extra time, they won the Final against South Korea 3–2.

Group A

Knockout stage

Australia national under-23 soccer team

Friendlies

Cup competitions

Australia Cup

The competition began on 8 October 1967. Sixteen clubs had entered the competition with the final two clubs Melbourne Hungaria and APIA Leichhardt qualifying for the Final. Melbourne won the final 4–3 in extra time with a hat-trick from Attila Abonyi and a goal from Frank Stoffels.

Final

References

External links
 Football Australia official website

1967 in Australian soccer
Seasons in Australian soccer